Kookmin Bank or KB Kookmin Bank is among four of the largest banks ranked by asset value in South Korea, as of the end of March 2014. It is the largest among banks in Korea and the 60th largest in the world as of 2017.

History 
The current KB Kookmin Bank was formed in December 2000 in a merger between the old Kookmin Bank and the Housing & Commercial Bank. They were both founded by the Korean government in the 1960s for special purposes. Kookmin Bank, which catered towards providing financial services for middle and low income consumers, was privatized in 1995. During the Asian financial crises both banks acquired other financially troubled banks. The merger of the two banks was partly due to the government policy of making banks bigger and more stable. After the merger, KB acquired various companies include credit card, insurance and brokerage firms, transforming into the current financial group in 2008. In September 2004, Kookmin Bank said it would restate its 2003 and 2004 earnings after a financial watchdog found that the bank avoided $270 million in taxes.

See also

Cheongju KB Stars
Goyang KB Kookmin Bank FC, a defunct South Korean football team
Rainy Sky SA v Kookmin Bank
List of South Korean companies
List of Banks in South Korea

References

External links
Official Website

 
Banks of South Korea
Companies based in Seoul
South Korean brands
Multinational companies headquartered in South Korea
Banks established in 1963
South Korean companies established in 1963